Derolathrus ceylonicus, is a species of Jacobson beetle endemic to Sri Lanka.

References 

Bostrichoidea
Insects of Sri Lanka
Insects described in 1979